Dr. Tony Knowles was the President of the British Columbia Institute of Technology (BCIT).  A chemist by training, Knowles has been awarded the Queen's Golden Jubilee Medal.

Knowles has a BSc and PhD in physical chemistry from the University of Waterloo. Following a variety of private sector and academic posts he was appointed President of BCIT in 2000 and stepped down in May 2007.

See also
 List of University of Waterloo people

References

Canadian chemists
Canadian university and college chief executives
Academic staff of the British Columbia Institute of Technology
Living people
Year of birth missing (living people)
Place of birth missing (living people)